Walmer railway station serves Walmer in Kent, England. The station and all trains serving it are operated by Southeastern.

Facilities
The station has two platforms, connected by a subway. A ticket office is open part-time.

History
The first plans for a station here were by the Kent Railway in 1836. However, Walmer was slow to grow as a resort compared to many other towns on the Kent coastline, and progress stalled. Further schemes to connect Walmer to the railway network were proposed in November 1846 and March 1854, but neither secured sufficient funding. The London, Chatham & Dover Railway (LDCR) announced plans for a line between Walmer,  and Adisham in October 1872, but failed to secure the funding from Parliament. 

Construction of the station was delayed owing to problems buying the relevant land, and it cost £14,000 to build. The line was the only one jointly owned by the rival South Eastern Railway and London, Chatham and Dover Railway and remained independent until the Grouping. The line has been described as one of the more spectacular in southern England. Gas lighting was installed at the station by the end of the year. A station closer to the sea was proposed in 1898, but rejected.

A Pullman camping coach was positioned here by the Southern Region from 1963 to 1967.
Goods services were withdrawn from the station in 1961.

Services
All services at Walmer are operated by Southeastern using  and  EMUs.

The typical off-peak service in trains per hour is:
 1 tph to London St Pancras International
 1 tph to 

During the peak hours, the station is also served by a number of services between Ramsgate and London Charing Cross via .

Incidents
On 6 July 1898, a set of vehicles at the station broke free and ran down the incline towards Deal, where they collided with an empty train, causing £269 of damage.

References
Citations

Sources

External links

Dover District
Railway stations in Kent
DfT Category E stations
Former Dover and Deal Joint Railway stations
Railway stations in Great Britain opened in 1881
Railway stations served by Southeastern
1881 establishments in England